Gilbert Morris (May 13, 1929 —February 18, 2016) was a Christy Award-winning Christian author.  He is also sometimes cited as Gilbert L. Morris or Gilbert Leslie Morris.

Gilbert was born May 24 in Forrest City, Arkansas, the son of Osceola M. and Jewell Irene Gilbert Morris.

He was a pastor for 10 years before becoming Professor of English at Ouachita Baptist University in Arkansas.  He has a Ph.D at the University of Arkansas.  During the summers of 1984 and 1985, he did postgraduate work at the University of London.

He lived in Gulf Shores, Alabama with his wife, Johnnie.  He had 3 children, including a daughter, Lynn Morris and a son, Alan Morris, who have both co-written with him. His other daughter is named Stacy Smith. His granddaughter Dixie, who helped write the Dixie Series, also lived in Gulf Shores, with her husband Brad Downs and their son Jackson Gilbert Downs.

Many of Dr.Morris' books are published by Bethany House Publishers.

Books by Dr. Gilbert Morris 

Dr.Morris wrote many series, as well as authoring with others.

House of Winslow series

This series chronicles the Winslow family from Gilbert, who was on the Mayflower, continuing on through American history until Luke, who fought in World War II.

Published by Bethany House.

The first part of this series was originally published with one set of covers (starting in 1986), and then in 2004, they started republishing them all with a new set of covers.  Everything from that point on (from The Shining Badge forward) was never published with the original design.  The new covers do not feature a book number, but instead focus on the year the story took place.

 The Honorable Imposter, 1986 - story of Gilbert Winslow in 1620
 The Captive Bride, 1987 - story of Rachel Winslow in 1659
 The Indentured Heart, 1988 - story of Adam Winslow in 1740
 The Gentle Rebel, 1988 - story of Nathan Winslow in 1775
 The Saintly Buccaneer, 1988 - story of Paul Winslow in 1777 (American Revolution)
 The Holy Warrior, 1989 - story of Christmas Winslow in 1798
 The Reluctant Bridegroom, 1990 - story of Sky Winslow in 1838
 The Last Confederate, 1990 - story of Thad Novak and the Winslows in 1860 (Civil War)
 The Dixie Widow, 1991 - story of Belle Winslow Wickham and Davis Winslow in 1862 (Civil War)
 The Wounded Yankee, 1992 - story of Zack Winslow in 1862
 The Union Belle, 1992 - story of Mark Winslow and Lola Montez in 1867
 The Final Adversary, 1992 - story of Barney Winslow in 1894
 The Crossed Sabres, 1993 - story of Thomas Winslow in 1875
 The Valiant Gunman, 1993 - story of Dan Winslow in 1874
 The Gallant Outlaw, 1994 - story of Lanie Winslow and Lobo Smith in 1890
 The Jeweled Spur, 1994 - story of Laurie Winslow and Cody Rogers in 1883
 The Yukon Queen, 1995 - story of Cassidy Winslow and Serena Stevens in 1896
 The Rough Rider, 1995 - story of Aaron Winslow and his brother Lewis in 1893 (Rough riders in Cuba)
 The Iron Lady, 1996  - story of cousins Esther, Ruth, and Priscilla Winslow in 1903
 The Silver Star, 1997  - story of Priscilla Winslow in 1905
 The Shadow Portrait, 1998 - story of cousins Peter and Phil Winslow in 1907
 The White Hunter, 1999  - story of John Winslow (Africa) and Annie Rogers (Titanic) in 1912
 The Flying Cavalier, 1999 - story of Lance Winslow in 1914 (France)
 The Glorious Prodigal, 2000 - story of Stuart and Leah Winslow in 1917
 The Amazon Quest, 2001 - story of Emily Winslow in 1918
 The Golden Angel, 2001 - story of Erin Winslow in 1922
 The Heavenly Fugitive, 2002 - story of siblings Phillip and Amelia Winslow in 1927
 The Fiery Ring, 2002 - story of Joy Winslow in 1928
 The Pilgrim Song, 2003 - story of Lewis and his daughter Hannah Winslow in 1929 (Great Depression)
 The Beloved Enemy, 2003 - story of Joshua Winslow in 1931
 The Shining Badge, 2004 - story of Jennifer Winslow in 1931
 The Royal Handmaid, 2004 - story of Travis Winslow in 1935
 The Silent Harp, 2004 - story of Sharon Winslow in 1935
 The Virtuous Woman, 2005 - story of Grace Winslow in 1935
 The Gypsy Moon, 2005 - story of Gabrielle Winslow in 1940
 The Unlikely Allies, 2005 - story of Mallory Anne Winslow in 1940
 The High Calling, 2006 - story of Katherine Winslow in 1940
 The Hesitant Hero, 2006 - story of Tyler Winslow in 1940
 The Widow's Choice, 2006 - story of Alona Winslow Jennings in 1941
 The White Knight, 2007 - story of Luke Winslow in 1942

The Winslow Breed is a trilogy of prequels.
 Honor in the Dust, 2009 - story of Stuart Winslow (reign of King Henry VIII)
 When the Heavens Fall, 2010 - story of Brandon Winslow (reign of Queen Mary)
 As the Sparks Fly Upward, 2011 - story of Colin Winslow (reign of Queen Elizabeth I)

Appomattox Saga series
Published by Tyndale House.  Republished beginning in 2000 by Living Books.

 A Covenant Of Love, 1992 - story of Clay Rocklin
 Gate Of His Enemies, 1992 - story of Denton Rocklin and Deborah Steele  
 Where Honor Dwells, 1993 - story of Rachel Franklin
 Land Of The Shadow, 1993 - story of Paul Bristol
 Out Of The Whirlwind, 1994 - story of Burke Rocklin
 The Shadow Of His Wings, 1994 - story of Lowell Rocklin
 Wall Of Fire, 1995 - story of Allyn Griffeth Rocklin  
 Stars In Their Courses, 1995 - story of Frank Rocklin  
 Chariots In The Smoke, 1997 - story of David Rocklin  
 A Witness In Heaven, 1998 - story of Austin and Marie Bristol

Reno Western Saga
Published by Tyndale House.

This series was originally called Jim Reno Westerns Series, and when the first four books were republished in 1992, they renamed the books and the series.

 Reno, 1992 (originally The Drifter, 1986)
 Rimrock, 1992 (originally The Deputy, 1986)
 Ride The Wild River, 1992 (originally The Runaway, 1987)
 Boomtown, 1992 (originally The Vigilante, 1988)
 Valley Justice, 1995
 Lone Wolf, 1995

Price of Liberty series
Published by W Publishing Group. Co-written with Bobby Funderburk.

 A Call To Honor, 1993
 The Color Of The Star, 1993
 All The Shining Young Men, 1993
 The End Of Glory, 1993
 A Silence In Heaven, 1993
 A Time To Heal, 1994

Far Fields series
Published by Stardust Publishers. Co-written with Bobby Funderbuck

 Beyond the River, 1993
 The Remnant, 1997

American Century series
Published by Revell Publishers.

This set was originally called the American Odyssey Series.  Each book has been renamed for a new publication beginning in 2005.

 A Bright Tomorrow, 2005 (originally A Time to be Born, 1994)
 Hope Takes Flight, 2006 (originally A Time to Die, 1994)
 One Shining Moment, 2006 (originally A Time to Laugh, 1995)
 A Season of Dreams, 2007 (originally A Time to Weep, 1996)
 Winds of Change, 2007 (originally A Time for War, 1997) 
 Pages of Promise, 2007 (originally A Time to Build, 1998)
 Dawn of a New Day, 2008 (this conclusion was not previously published)

Wakefield Dynasty series

Published by Tyndale House Publishers.

 The Sword Of Truth, 1994
 The Winds Of God, 1994 
 The Shield Of Honor, 1995
 The Fields Of Glory, 1995
 The Ramparts Of Heaven, 1996
 The Song Of Princes, 1997
 A Gathering Of Eagles, 1998

Cheney Duvall, M.D. series

This series was co-written with his daughter, Lynn Morris

Published by Bethany House: "A trailblazing woman of courage, Cheney Duvall graduates from the first American college to grant degrees to women physicians just as the Civil War ends. Long-standing prejudices have not dissipated, however, and she must prove herself time and again--testing her dedication and the faith that compels her."

 The Stars for a Light, 1994
 Shadow of the Mountains, 1994
 A City Not Forsaken, 1995
 Toward the Sunrising, 1996
 Secret Place of Thunder, 1996
 In The Twilight, In The Evening, 1997
 Island of the Innocent, 1998
 Driven With the Wind, 2000

Liberty Bell series

Published by Bethany House. This series shared several characters with the House of Winslow series, especially those of "The Indentured Rebel".
'
 Sound The Trumpet, 1995 
 Song In A Strange Land, 1996  
 Tread Upon The Lion, 1996 
 Arrow Of The Almighty, 1997 
 Wind From The Wilderness, 1998  
 The Right Hand Of God, 1999  
 Command The Sun, 2000

Katy Steele Adventures 

Published by Tyndale House Publishers. Co-written with his son, Alan Morris.

 Tracks Of Deceit, 1996
 Imperial Intrigue, 1996
 Depths of Malice, 1997

Spirit Of Appalachia series

This series was co-written with Aaron McCarver.

Published by Bethany House: "America's first frontier were the misty Appalachian Mountains and the men and women who braved their crossing needed all the faith, courage, and hope they could muster. This series brings together all the romance, excitement, and danger of early frontier life."

 Over The Misty Mountains, 1996
 Beyond The Quiet Hills, 1997
 Among The King's Soldiers, 1998 
 Beneath The Mockingbird's Wings, 2000
 Around The River's Bend, 2002

Chronicles Of The Golden Frontier series

Published by Crossway Books, a division of Good News Publishers. Co-written with J. Landon Ferguson.

 Riches Untold, 1998 
 Unseen Riches, 1999 
 Above The Clouds, 1999  
 The Silver Thread, 2000

Omega Trilogy 

Published by Thomas Nelson. Co-written with his daughter and son, Lynn Morris & Alan Morris.

 The Beginning Of Sorrows, 1999
 Fallen Stars, Bitter Waters, 2000 
 Seven Golden Vials, never released

The Dani Ross Mysteries

This series was originally known as the Danielle Ross Mysteries.  It has been republished with new names by Crossway Books, a division of Good News Publishers, and also modernized to fit the 2000 world instead of the 90s.

 One by One, 2000 (originally Guilt by Association, 1991) 
 And Then There Were Two, 2000
 The End of Act Three, 2001 (originally The Final Curtain, 1991)
 Four of a Kind, 2002

Books in the original series:
 Guilt by Association, 1991
 The Final Curtain, 1991
 Deadly Deception, 1992
 Revenge at the Rodeo, 1993
 The Quality of Mercy, 1993
 Race with Death, 1994

Cheney and Shiloh: The Inheritance series
This is a follow up series to Cheney Duvall, M.D.  Also co-written with his daughter, Lynn Morris

Published by Bethany House: "Cheney Duvall is now married to Shiloh, but that doesn't mean life will get any easier. Shiloh's past continues to come back to haunt them, and the couple finds themselves swept up in adventure and excitement as they use their medical skills to help the needy."

 Where Two Seas Met, 2001 
 The Moon By Night, 2004
 There is a Season, 2005

Lions of Judah series

Published by Bethany House: story of "...the Jewish ancestry of Jesus of Nazareth. ... an exciting series with riveting, action-packed adventures that will entertain, enlighten, and challenge readers to look anew at early heroes of the faith."

 Heart of a Lion, 2002 
 No Woman So Fair, 2003 
 The Gate of Heaven, 2004 
 Till Shiloh Comes, 2005
 By Way of the Wilderness, 2005
 Daughter of Deliverance, 2006

Lonestar Legacy series

Published by Integrity Publishers, a division of Thomas Nelson.  More on this series is available under Lonestar Legacy.

 Deep in the Heart, 2003
 The Yellow Rose, 2004
 The Eyes of Texas, 2005

The Creole series

Published by Thomas Nelson.  Co-written with Lynn Morris.
 
 The Exiles, 2003 (also called The Exiles: Chantel)
 The Immortelles, 2004 (also called The Immortelles: Damita)
 The Alchemy, 2004 (also called The Alchemy: Simone)
 The Tapestry, 2005 (also called The Tapestry: Leonie)

Singing River series

Published by Zondervan Publishers.

 The Homeplace, 2005
 The Dream, 2006
 The Miracle, 2007
 The Courtship, 2007

Jacques & Cleo, Cat Detectives 

Published by Harvest House: "For those that love cats--and suspense in the same book, this one is for you."

 What the Cat Dragged In, 2007
 The Cat's Pajamas, 2007
 When the Cat's Away, 2007

Wagon Wheel series

Published by Broadman Holman (B&H Books)

 Santa Fe Woman, 2006
 A Man for Temperance, 2007
 Joelle's Secret, 2008
 Angel Train, coming June 2009

The Lady Trent Mysteries

Published by Thomas Nelson

 The Mermaid in the Basement, 2007
 A Conspiracy of Ravens, 2008
 Sonnet to a Dead Contessa, 2009

Water Wheel series

Published by Broadman Holman (B&H Books)

 The River Queen, 2011
 The River Rose, 2012

Youth fiction

Standalone youth fiction:
 Journey to Freedom, 2000 - published by Crossway Books, a division of Good News Publishers.
 Captain Chip and the March to Victory, 1994 - published by Moody Publishers
 Corporal Chip and the Call to Battle, 1994 - published by Moody Publishers

Barney Buck series
Published by Tyndale House.

 Barney Buck and the Buck of Goober Holler, 1985
 Barney Buck and the flying solar-cycle, 1985
 Barney Buck and the Kamikaze Charger, 1985
 Barney Buck and the Rough Rider Special, 1985
 Barney Buck and the Phantom of the Circus, 1985
 Barney Buck and the World's Wackiest Wedding, 1986

Seven Sleepers series
Published by Moody Publishers.

 Flight of the Eagles, 1994
 The Gates of Neptune, 1994
 The Sword of Camelot, 1995
 The Caves that Time Forgot, 1995
 Winged Raiders of the Desert, 1995
 Empress of the Underworld, 1996
 Voyage of the Dolphin, 1996
 Attack of the Amazons, 1997
 Escape with the Dream Maker, 1997
 The Final Kingdom, 1997

Bonnets and Bugles series
Published by Moody Publishers.

 Drummer Boy At Bull Bun, 1995
 Yankee Belles in Dixie, 1995
 The Secret of Richmond Manor, 1995
 The Soldier Boy's Discovery, 1995
 Blockade Runner, 1996
 The Gallant Boys of Gettysburg, 1996
 The Battle of Lookout Mountain, 1996
 Encounter At Cold Harbor, 1997
 Fire Over Atlanta, 1997
 Bring the Boys Home, 1997

Time Navigators series
Published by Bethany House.

 The Dangerous Voyage, 1995
 Vanishing Clues, 1996
 Race Against Time, 1997

Dixie Morris Animal Adventures
Published by Moody Publishers.

 Dixie and Jumbo, 1998
 Dixie and Stripes, 1998
 Dixie and Dolly, 1998
 Dixie and Sandy, 1998
 Dixie and Ivan, 1998
 Dixie and Bandit, 1998
 Dixie and Champ, 1999
 Dixie and Perry, 1999
 Dixie and Blizzard, 1999
 Dixie and Flash, 1999

Daystar Voyages series
Published by Moody Publishers and co-written by Dan Meeks.

 Secret of the Planet Makon, 1998
 Wizards of the Galaxy, 1998
 Escape from the Red Comet, 1998
 Dark Spell Over Morlandria, 1998
 Revenge of the Space Pirate, 1998
 Invasion of the Killer Locusts, 1999
 Dangers of the Rainbow Nebula, 1999
 The Frozen Space Pilot, 1999
 The White Dragon of Sharnu, 2000
 Attack of the Denebian Starship, 2000

Too Smart Jones series
Published by Moody Publishers.

 Too Smart Jones and the Buried Jewels, 1999
 Too Smart Jones and the Disappearing Dogs, 1999
 Too Smart Jones and the Pool Party Thief, 1999
 Too Smart Jones and the Cat's Secret, 2000
 Too Smart Jones and the Dangerous Woman, 2000
 Too Smart Jones and the Mysterious Artist, 2000
 Too Smart Jones and the Spooky Mountain, 2000
 Too Smart Jones and the Stolen Bicycle, 2000
 Too Smart Jones and the Stranger in the Cave, 2000
 Too Smart Jones and the Wilderness Mystery, 2000

Seven Sleepers: The Lost Chronicles series
Published by Moody Publishers.

A follow up series to the Seven Sleepers Series.

 The Spell of the Crystal Chair, 2000, flight of the eagles
 The Savage Game of Lord Zarak, 2000
 The Strange Creatures of Dr. Korbo, 2000
 City of the Cyborgs, 2000
 The Temptation of Pleasure Island, 2000
 The Victims of Nimbo, 2000
 The Terrible Beast of Zor, 2000

Adventures of the Kerrigan Kids series
Published by Moody Publishers.

 Painted Warriors and Wild Lions: Travel in Africa (2001)
 Buckingham Palace and the Crown Jewels: Travel in England (2001)
 Kangaroos and the Outback: Travel in Australia (2001)
 Nine-Story Pagodas and Double Decker Buses: Travel in Hong Kong (2001)

Standalone novels

 Delaney, 1984 - published by Tyndale House
 All That Glitters, 1999 - published by Crossway Books, a division of Good News Publishers.
 Through A Glass Darkly, 1999 - published by Bethany House
 Jacob's Way, 2001 - published by Zondervan
 Edge Of Honor, 2001 - published by Zondervan.
 Winner of the 2001 Christy Award for North American Historical.
 Jordan's Star, 2002 - published by Zondervan.
 The Spider Catcher, 2003 - published by Zondervan.
 God's Handmaiden, 2004 - published by Zondervan.
 Charade, 2005 - published by Zondervan.
 Heaven Sent Husband, 2005 - published by Steeple Hill Books
 The Angel Of Bastogne, 2005 - published by Broadman Holman (B&H Books)

Resources 
 Contemporary Authors Online, Gale, 2006. Reproduced in Biography Resource Center. Farmington Hills, Mich.: Thomson Gale. 2006. Accessed Sep 8, 2006 through online library

References

External links 
 Zondervan: Gilbert Morris 
 Thomas Nelson Publishers: Gilbert Morris 
 Fantastic Fiction: Gilbert L. Morris

Christian writers
2016 deaths
20th-century American novelists
21st-century American novelists
American male novelists
American historical novelists
Writers from Arkansas
Novelists from Alabama
1929 births
People from Forrest City, Arkansas
People from Gulf Shores, Alabama
Ouachita Baptist University
20th-century American male writers
21st-century American male writers